Ligue 2 is the second division of men's football in France.

Ligue 2 can refer to:

CAF (Africa)
Algerian Ligue Professionnelle 2, Algeria
Ligue 2 (Ivory Coast), Ivory Coast
Tunisian Ligue Professionnelle 2, Tunisia
Ligue 2 (Senegal)

OFC (Oceania)
Tahiti Ligue 2, Tahiti

See also 
Ligue 1 (disambiguation)